2009 Kashiwa Reysol season

Competitions

Player statistics

Other pages
 J. League official site

Kashiwa Reysol
Kashiwa Reysol seasons